G.T. Dhungel (Gay Tshering Dhungel) is an Indian politician who is currently serving as the Member of Sikkim Legislative Assembly from the Upper Tadong Constituency.

He is a member of the Sikkim Krantikari Morcha which he joined in 2019.

Early life and education 
G.T. Dhungel was born in Sikkim to the Lt. Augustine Dhungel and Pema Ongkit Lepcha in 1959. He has done his schooling from Victoria Boys' School (Kurseong) and completed Bachelor of Engineering (Civil) from Assam Engineering College, Guwahati, Guwahati in 1984.

Political career 
G.T. Dhungel is a retired engineer and bureaucrat who turned to politics in 2019. He won the 2019 Sikkim Legislative Assembly election for Sikkim Democratic Front party and was elected MLA from 25-Upper Tadong Constituency.

Mr. Dhungel defeated Anand Lama by 416 votes.

Currently, he is the advisor to the Road and Bridges Department, Smart City Gangtok and Namchi, PHE Department and Irrigation & Flood Control Department, Government of Sikkim.

References 

Sikkim MLAs 2019–2024
Living people
Sikkim politicians
People from Guwahati
21st-century Indian politicians
Sikkim Democratic Front politicians
1959 births

Year of birth missing (living people)